Tziv'on (lit. Crayon) is a kibbutz in northern Israel. Located near Safed and the Lebanese border, it falls under the jurisdiction of Upper Galilee Regional Council.

History
The village was established in 1980 as a Nahal settlement, and was civilianised in 1986. It was named after the nearby Tziv'on Stream.

References

External links
Kibbutz website 

Kibbutzim
Kibbutz Movement
Nahal settlements
Populated places established in 1980
Populated places in Northern District (Israel)
1980 establishments in Israel